Salman Musaev (Azerbaijani: Salman Musa oğlu Musayev, 1958) is 11th and current Mufti of the Religious Council of the Caucasus.

Biography 
He was born in 1958 in Hamamlı village of Dmanisi Municipality of Georgia in the family of Musa Musaev. His first education was the Mir-Arab madrasa in the city of Bukhara in Uzbekistan, then the Dashkend Islam Institute and the Islamic University in Libya.

First, he served as an imam in the Juma mosque in Tbilisi, then as an assistant in the department of external relations of the Caucasus Muslims Board. In 1987, Haji Salman was appointed deputy of the mufti of the Religious Council of the Caucasus. At the IX Congress of the Muslims of Transcaucasia, held on July 25, 1989, he was appointed mufti.

Thanks to the well deserved respect and long service in the mosque, he was awarded the post of imam of the Haji Ajdarbey mosque. He works in it until now, having repeatedly visited Mecca.

In 2002, he was awarded the Order of Honor of the Republic of Georgia.

In 2018, president of Azerbaijan Ilham Aliyev has signed a decree on awarding Salman Musa with the Certificate of Merit of the president of Azerbaijan.

See also 

 Religious Council of the Caucasus
 Allahshikur Pashazadeh

References 

People from Georgia (country)
Muslim religious workers
Muftis
Living people
1958 births
Muftis of the Religious Council of the Caucasus